SS220 is an insect repellent with a broad range of efficacy.

It was developed in 2002 at the Chemicals Affecting Insect Behavior Laboratory of the United States Department of Agriculture and has been found to "exert repellent and deterrent effects upon the behavior of mosquitoes and sand flies". In the field, it has been shown to provide significantly better protection than DEET.  SS220 has a slightly fruity odor, tends not to provoke allergic skin reactions, lasts longer on the skin than other repellents, does not have an oily consistency, and does not tend to plasticize.  Its principal disadvantage is that only one stereoisomer of the molecule is active, meaning it will be much more costly to produce than icaridin. As of 2007 the chemical had not been registered, as the costs involved in registration are prohibitive.

See also
 Icaridin, another substituted-piperidine insect-repellent
 VUAA1, Experimental insect repellent

References

Insect repellents
Carboxamides
Piperidines
Cyclohexenes